The inter-confederation play-offs of qualification for the 2023 FIFA Women's World Cup was an international women's football tournament held in New Zealand from 17 to 23 February 2023. The twelve national teams involved in the tournament, including two only playing friendly matches, were required to register a squad of up to 23 players, including three goalkeepers. Only players in these squads were eligible to take part in the tournament.

Each team had to submit to FIFA a provisional release list of between 35 and 55 players per national team, including four goalkeepers. The release lists were not made public by FIFA. From the preliminary squad, the final list of up to 23 players per national team were submitted to FIFA. FIFA published the final lists with squad numbers on their website on 13 February (New Zealand time). The final matchday at club level for players named in the final squads was 12 February 2023, while clubs had to release their players by the following day. In the event that a player on the submitted squad list suffered from an injury or illness prior to her team's first match of the tournament, that player could be replaced at any time up to 24 hours before their first match. The team doctor and the FIFA General Medical Officer had to both confirm that the injury or illness was severe enough to prevent the player from participating in the tournament. Replacement players did not need to be limited to the preliminary list.

The position listed for each player is per the official squad list published by FIFA. The age listed for each player is as of 17 February 2023, the first day of the tournament. The numbers of caps and goals listed for each player do not include any matches played after the start of the tournament. The club listed is the club for which the player last played a competitive match prior to the tournament. The nationality for each club reflects the national association (not the league) to which the club is affiliated. A flag is included for coaches who are of a different nationality to their team.

Group A

Cameroon
Coach: Gabriel Zabo

Portugal
Coach: Francisco Neto

Thailand
Coach:  Miyo Okamoto

Group B

Chile
Coach: José Letelier

Haiti
Coach:  Nicolas Delépine

Senegal
Coach: Serigne Cissé

Group C

Chinese Taipei
Coach: Yen Shih-kai

Panama
Coach:  Ignacio Quintana

Papua New Guinea
Coach:  Spencer Prior

Daisy Winas withdrew from the initially announced squad and was replaced by Isabella Natera.

Paraguay
Coach:  Marcello Frigério

Friendly matches

Argentina
Coach: Germán Portanova

Argentina only named a squad of 21 players, leaving the number 10 and 12 shirts unassigned.

New Zealand
Coach:  Jitka Klimková

New Zealand announced their final squad on 9 February 2023. Anna Leat withdrew injured and was replaced by Murphy Sheaff on 10 February. Victoria Esson withdrew injured and was replaced by Brianna Edwards on 13 February. Rebekah Stott withdrew injured and was replaced by Michaela Foster on 16 February.

References

External links

Play-off squads
Association football women's tournament squads